Glen Eugene Bredon (August 24, 1932 in Fresno, California – May 8, 2000, in North Fork, California) was an American mathematician who worked in the area of topology.

Education and career
Bredon received a bachelor's degree from Stanford University in 1954 and a master's degree from Harvard University in 1955. In 1958 he wrote his PhD thesis at Harvard (Some theorems on transformation groups) under the supervision of Andrew M. Gleason. Starting in 1960 he worked as a professor at the University of California, Berkeley and since 1969 at Rutgers University, until he retired in 1993, after which he moved to North Fork, California.

From 1958 to 1960 and 1966/67 he was at the Institute for Advanced Study.

The Bredon cohomology of topological spaces under action of a topological group is named after him.

In the late 1980s, he wrote the program DOS.MASTER for Apple II computers. He is the author of the programs Merlin (a macro assembler) and ProSel for Apple machines.

Personal life
In 1963, while at Berkeley, he married folk singer Anne Bredon (née Loeb), with whom he had two children, Aaron and Joelle.

Apple software
Bredon is the author of the programs Merlin (a macro assembler) and ProSel for Apple machines.

DOS.MASTER (also: DOS Master) is a program for Apple II computers which allows Apple DOS 3.3 programs to be placed on a hard drive or 3½" floppy disk and run from ProDOS. Bredon wrote it as a commercial program during the late 1980s where it experienced widespread success; it was released into the public domain by his family after the author's death.

DOS.MASTER was created as a result of Apple Computer's abandonment of the DOS 3.3 operating system and its subsequent replacement by ProDOS. Apple provided a program to copy files from DOS 3.3 volumes to new ProDOS volumes; however, programs written for DOS 3.3 did not run on ProDOS volumes. DOS.MASTER enabled a widely installed base of previously ProDOS incompatible programs written for DOS 3.3 to be run under ProDOS. DOS.MASTER took a large ProDOS partition, formatted it as a file, and then created a series of DOS 3.3 volumes within that file. The program allowed the user to create one of four DOS 3.3 volume sizes: 140 KB (the standard capacity of an Apple II 5¼" floppy disk), 160 KB, 200 KB, or 400 KB (the maximum that DOS 3.3 could address). Up to 255 of these volumes could be created on the larger ProDOS partition, space allowing, essentially simulating a very large stack of virtual floppy disk drives.

Works

Equivariant Cohomology Theories, Lecture Notes in Mathematics, Springer Verlag, 1967

Topology and Geometry, Graduate Texts in Mathematics, Springer Verlag 1993, 1996

References

External links 
 About Glen Bredon – In Memoriam

1932 births
2000 deaths
People from Fresno, California
Mathematicians from California
20th-century American mathematicians
Stanford University alumni
Harvard University alumni
University of California, Berkeley College of Letters and Science faculty
Rutgers University faculty
Institute for Advanced Study visiting scholars
Topologists